Notari is a surname. It may refer to:


People
 Aldo Notari (1932–2006), Italian baseball executive, and a president of the International Baseball Federation
 Angelo Notari (1566/1573–1663), Italian composer
 Elvira Notari (1875–1946), Italian silent-era film director
 Louis Notari (1879–1961), Monégasque writer
 Louis Notari Library, the National library of Monaco
 Mattia Notari (born 1979), Italian footballer
 Nicola Notari, Italian cinematographer and film director
 Umberto Notari (1878–1950), Italian journalist, author, and editor

Other
 Notari Matsutarō, Japanese sports-manga magazine serial

See also
 Notaris, a disambiguation page